Palazzo Adriano (IPA: ,) is a town and comune of Arbëresh origin in the Metropolitan City of Palermo, Sicily, southern Italy.

Located in the heart of Sicania on the northern slopes of Monte delle Rose, almost equidistant from Palermo and Agrigento, it is a town of Arbëreshë origin. Although the inhabitants have abandoned the use of the Arbëresh language, the town's inhabitants preserve the Byzantine rite in their liturgy.

Palazzo Adriano is best known internationally for being among the filming locations of the Oscar-winning film Cinema Paradiso. The local economy is primarily dedicated to agriculture.

History

The first mention of a casale Adrianum (farmstead of Adriano) dates from before 1060 under the reign of the Norman Roger I of Sicily. More reliable is information about the hamlet of Palazzo Adriano reported in a 1243 document. From 1282, the fiefs land holdings that now constitute the area of Palazzo Adriano saw more than thirty baronies granted leases by the abbots of the monastery of Santa Maria di Fossanova. In 1787, the Royal Court of Ferdinand IV of Naples captured all these land holdings, which fell under the control of Palermo.

Ethnic groups

Starting in the 15th century, a group of Albanians, the Arbëreshë, settled in the sparsely populated areas around Palazzo Adriano. The fall of the last Albanian resistance under Skanderbeg after the Ottoman invasion prompted many Albanians to flee Albania. The Arbëreshë settled in small farmhouses built by shepherds and peasants. Throughout the ensuing centuries, the Arbëreshë kept their culture intact and continued to speak Albanian. In the 19th century, the flow of immigrants from Albania dried up, such that the Albanians in Palazzo Adriano became cut off from those in their homeland.

Although Palazzo Adriano is defined as an 'Albanian minority town' under the Law 482/99 ('Rules on the protection of historical linguistic minorities'), the Arbëresh language is no longer the common language within the Albanian community, and is today lost. The Albanian language continues in the prayer and liturgy of churches that follow the Byzantine Rite.

Main sights

Church of Maria SS. Assunta (16th century), of Byzantine rite
Church of Maria SS. del Lume (18th century), of Latin rite
Church of Maria SS. del Carmelo (16th century). It has a single nave, with a portal with Corinthian columns.
Sanctuary of San Nicola (16th century)
Sanctuary of Santa Maria delle Grazie (16th century)
Bourbon Castle

Culture

In 1988, Giuseppe Tornatore also chose Palazzo Adriano as the setting for his film Nuovo Cinema Paradiso.

Notable people 
Giovanni Emanuele Bidera, librettist and playwright, born in Palazzo Adriano in 1784.
Francesco Crispi, Prime Minister of Italy
Giuseppe Crispi, author of the first monograph on the Albanian language
Gavril Dara Junior, politician and poet

References

External links
Official website

Arbëresh settlements
Municipalities of the Metropolitan City of Palermo